The 1944 Camp Peary Pirates football team represented Camp Peary during the 1944 college football season. The team compiled a 5–2 record.

Red Strader, who was coach of the Saint Mary's Gaels football team before the war, was the head coach.

The team garnered attention when, shortly before the season began, the Navy assigned eight former NFL players to Camp Peary. The eight included halfbacks Joe Vodicka, Andy Uram, Len Janiak, and Bob Morrow, fullback Joe Bokant, center Al Matuza, and tackle Bob Bjorklund. Other notable players on the team included ends Ralph Schilling and Gregg Browning and tackle Russ Letlow who was later named to the NFL 1930s All-Decade Team.

Schedule

References

Camp Peary
Camp Peary Pirates football
Camp Peary Pirates football